FC Zorky Krasnogorsk is a Russian football team based in Krasnogorsk. It was founded in 1968 and played in the third-tier Soviet Second League from 1968 to 1969, from 1982 to 1989 and from 2017 to 2020, participating in amateur competitions in other years. For the 2017–18 season, it was licensed to play in the third-tier Russian Professional Football League.

The club was dissolved due to lack of financing in June 2020.

For the 2022–23 season, it was licensed once again for the Russian third-tier Russian Second League.

Current squad
As of 22 February 2023, according to the Second League website.

References

External links
  Official VK site

Association football clubs established in 1968
Football clubs in Russia
Football in Moscow Oblast
2019 establishments in Russia